The Japan Times ST (formerly Shukan ST until March 2013) is a weekly newspaper published by The Japan Times for learners of English language. It was originally called Student Times, but changed to Shukan ST since a significant portion of its readers were not students. It has articles on news, movies, lifestyle, opinions, and other topics, in English-speaking countries, attracting learners of English and helping them with notes on terms. Asahi Weekly, by Asahi Shimbun, is its chief competition, although they are distributed by the same network.

External links
The Japan Times ST Official Site

Weekly newspapers published in Japan